is a Japanese alternative rock band, signed to Toy's Factory. They debuted in 2003, with the album Aobozu.

Biography 

Hozzy, Kamei and Fujimori were originally childhood friends, all coming from Odawara. In 1999, they formed a band in called  in 1999, that was a cover band for Japanese punk band The Blue Hearts. In 2000, they changed the band's name to aobōzu (藍坊主) - the name of a mythical yōkai (Japanese folk legend ghost), however with a different kanji for ao (藍 instead of 青). In 2001, Yūichi Tanaka (a friend of Fujimori's since kindergarten) joined the band as its guitarist. The band then centred their live activities in their hometown, as well as around the Tokyo areas of Hachiōji and Shimokitazawa.

In 2002, the band produced their first self-published CD: . The following year, the band independently released their debut album Aobozu through Buddy Records, and had their songs featured on many punk compilation albums.

In 2004, the band's drummer Kamei left, and was replaced by a classmate of Tanakas, Takurō Watanabe, as a session drummer. The band then made their major debut under Toy's Factory, Hiroshige Blue, which reached the top 30 on the Oricon albums charts.

Since then, the band has toured exclusively, gradually gaining more fame. Their 2010 album Mizukane reached the top 10 on Oricon.

Discography

Albums

Singles

References

External links 
Aobozu Official Site 
Toy's Factory Label Site 
Aobozu staff+member blog 

Japanese rock music groups
Japanese punk rock groups
Musical groups established in 1999
Toy's Factory artists
Musical groups from Kanagawa Prefecture
1999 establishments in Japan